Flabellina dana is a species of sea slug, an aeolid nudibranch, a marine gastropod mollusc in the family Flabellinidae.

Distribution

This species was described from the Caribbean Sea. It has also been reported from Florida.

References

Flabellinidae
Gastropods described in 2006